Greymouth Airport  is a small, uncontrolled aerodrome located in the suburb of Blaketown, 1 Nautical mile (1.9 km) south of the Greymouth CBD on the West Coast of the South Island of New Zealand.

The aerodrome is operated by the Grey District Council and is available for general use without notice to the operator. Hangarage for light aircraft and refuelling facilities are available.

The most recent commercial flights were operated by Air West Coast which began on 8 November 2002 direct to Westport then onto Wellington and to Christchurch. These services were discontinued on 1 August 2008, apparently due to high costs and strong competition from Air New Zealand. Coast Air operated a daily de Havilland Twin Otter service to Christchurch and Nelson from 1986 to 1988.

Today there are no scheduled flights using the airport. Charter flights can be arranged via Air West Coast. One such charter flight collects passengers off the TranzAlpine train at Greymouth station and flies them back to Christchurch over Mt Cook and the Glaciers.

See also

 List of airports in New Zealand
 List of airlines of New Zealand
 Transport in New Zealand

References

External links
 NZAIP Volume 4 AD
 New Zealand AIP (PDF)

Airports in New Zealand
Greymouth
Transport buildings and structures in the West Coast, New Zealand